Baken Kydykeyeva (20 September 1920 or 1923 – December 1993 or 15 January 1994) was a Kyrgyz actress.

She made her debut at the Young Spectators Theatre at the age of 16. Five years later, she joined the Naryn Regional Theatre, and subsequently the Kyrgyz National Theatre. She played a major role in the 1955 picture Saltanat (Салтанат), followed by Toktogul (Токтогул) in 1959, The First Teacher (Биринчи мугалим) in 1965 and The Milky Way (Саманчынын жолу) in  1967. She was a recipient of the People’s Artist of the USSR in 1970.

References

Kyrgyzstani actresses
Soviet film actresses
1920 births
1990s deaths
Soviet stage actresses
People's Artists of the USSR
20th-century Kyrgyzstani actors
20th-century Kyrgyzstani women
Burials at Ala-Archa Cemetery